Beves is a surname. Notable people with the surname include:

Donald Beves (1896–1961), English academic
Gordon Beves (1862–1927), South African cricket umpire

Surnames of French origin